Dayal is a given name. Notable people with the name include:

Benny Dayal (born 1984), a UAE-Indian playback singer
Bhagwat Dayal Sharma or B. D. Sharma (1918–1993), first Chief Minister of Haryana of Independent India
Bhawani Dayal Arya College, formerly known as Bhawani Dayal High School, a school established in Fiji in 1972
Dadu Dayal (1544–1603), sant from Gujarat, India
Data Dayal Maharishi or Maharishi Shiv Brat Lal, born in Bhadohi District of Uttar Pradesh state in India in 1860
Dau Dayal Joshi, former member of Lok Sabha from Kota
Dayal Ji or Advaitanand Ji (1846–1919), son of Tulsi Das Ji, born in Pukh, Nakshatra in the province of Bihar, India
Dayal Padmanabhan (born 1970), Indian film director and producer
Dayal Thakur (born 1952), Indian classical singer in the North Indian Hindustani music tradition
Deen Dayal Upadhyaya or Deendayal Upadhyaya (1916–1968), leader of the Bharatiya Jana Sangh, now the Bharatiya Janata Party
Har Dayal (1884–1939), Indian nationalist revolutionary who founded the Ghadar Party in America
Ishwar Dayal Mishra, Nepalese politician, belonging to the Tarai Madhes Loktantrik Party
Ishwar Dayal Swami or I.D. Swami, former union minister of state of India
John Dayal, (born 1948), Indian Christian activist and self-proclaimed "Dalit rights" activist
Lala Deen Dayal (1844–1905), Indian photographer
Manav Dayal I.C.Sharma, spiritual leader of Manavta Mandir Hoshiarpur, Punjab, India
Manish Dayal, American film and television actor
Manjula Dayal, Fijian businesswoman
Param Dayal or Baba Faqir Chand, (1886–1981), Indian master of Surat Shabd Yoga
Ram Dayal Munda (1939–2011), Indian scholar and regional music exponent
Ranjit Singh Dayal or Ranjit Singh Dyal (1928–2012), Indian Army general and an administrator
Sarveshwar Dayal Saxena (सर्वेश्वरदयाल सक्सेना) (1927–1983), Hindi writer, poet, columnist and playwright
Shankar Dayal Sharma (1918–1999), the ninth President of India serving from 1992 to 1997
Shankar Dayal Singh, contributor to the society and literature
Shiv Dayal Batish (1914–2006), Indian musician born in Patiala, India to a Brahmin family
Shiv Dayal Singh (1818–1878), Sant Mat guru
Vishwambhar Dayal Tripathi (1899–1959), Indian lawyer and politician
Diyal name also found in pashtoon saraiki caste.

See also
Dau Dayal Institute Of Vocational Education, Agra
Dayal Bagh, Garden of the Merciful Lord
Dayal Pur, census town in state of Delhi, India
Dayal Singh College, Lahore, affiliated to University of the Punjab, Lahore, Pakistan
Deen Dayal Upadhyay College of physically handicapped
Deen Dayal Upadhyay Gorakhpur University in Gorakhpur, Uttar Pradesh
Deen Dayal Upadhyaya College college of the University of Delhi in India
Kot Dayal Das industrial city in the province of Punjab
Ram Dayal Joshi or Baidyanath group, pharmaceutical firm specialising in Ayurvedic medicines
Dadyal
Diyala (disambiguation)
Diyale
Diyallı